Paris Stephens (born 22 October 1998) is an Australian pair skater. With partner Matthew Dodds, she is the 2013 Skate Down Under champion, the 2016 Volvo Open Cup silver medalist, and a four-time Australian national champion (2013-2015, 2017).

Competitive highlights

Pairs with Dodds

References 

Living people
1998 births
Australian female pair skaters
Figure skaters at the 2017 Asian Winter Games